Farrukhabadi is an Indian toponymic surname originating from the Farrukhabad in northern India. It may refer to
Anwar Farrukhabadi, Indian Sufi poet from Farrukhabad district
Rehmat Farrukhabadi (1942–1993), pen name of Muhammad Rehmatullah Qureshi, Pakistani author and Muslim scholar from Farrukhabad
Aqib Farrukhabadi, Journalist and Social Activist from Farrukhabad

Urdu-language surnames
Indian surnames
Toponymic surnames
People from Farrukhabad
Nisbas